The Tornado was a sailing event on the Sailing at the 1976 Summer Olympics program in Kingston, Ontario . Seven races were scheduled. 29 sailors, on 14 boats, from 14 nations competed. It was the time the event had been included on the Olympic sailing program.

Results 

DNF = Did Not Finish, DNS= Did Not Start, DSQ = Disqualified, PMS = Premature Start, YMP = Yacht Materially Prejudiced 
 = Male,  = Female

Daily standings

Notes

References 
 
 
 
 

Soling
Tornado (sailboat)